Sainte-Anne may refer to:

Canada

Alberta 
 Lac Ste. Anne (disambiguation), a number of places

Manitoba 
 Ste. Anne, Manitoba

New Brunswick 
 Sainte-Anne Parish, New Brunswick
 Sainte-Anne-de-Madawaska, New Brunswick
 Sainte-Anne-de-Kent, New Brunswick, a community in Wellington Parish, Kent County

Quebec 
 Sainte-Anne-de-Beaupré, Quebec, site of the Sainte-Anne-de-Beaupré basilica
 Sainte-Anne-de-Bellevue, Quebec, a municipality on the Island of Montreal
 Sainte-Anne-de-la-Pérade, Quebec, a municipality in the Mauricie Region
 Sainte-Anne-de-la-Pocatière, Quebec, a parish municipality in Kamouraska
 Sainte-Anne-de-la-Rochelle, Quebec, in Le Val-Saint-François
 Sainte-Anne-de-Sabrevois, Quebec, in Le Haut-Richelieu
 Sainte-Anne-du-Lac, Quebec (disambiguation), a number of places
 Sainte-Anne-des-Lacs, Quebec, in Les Pays-d'en-Haut
 Sainte-Anne-des-Monts, Quebec, in the Gaspésie region
 Sainte-Anne-des-Plaines, Quebec, in southwestern Quebec, northwest of Montreal in Thérèse-de-Blainville
 Sainte-Anne-de-Sorel, Quebec, a parish municipality, just north of Sorel-Tracy in Le Bas-Richelieu
 Sainte-Anne (provincial electoral district), a former Quebec provincial electoral district
 Basilique Sainte-Anne-de-Varennes, a basilica in Varennes

France
 Sainte-Anne, Doubs
 Sainte-Anne, Gers
 Sainte-Anne, Loir-et-Cher
 Sainte-Anne, Guadeloupe
 Sainte-Anne, Martinique
 Sainte-Anne-d'Auray, in the Morbihan 
 Sainte-Anne-Saint-Priest, in the Haute-Vienne 
 Sainte-Anne-sur-Brivet, in the Loire-Atlantique 
 Sainte-Anne-sur-Gervonde, in the Isère 
 Sainte-Anne-sur-Vilaine, in the Ille-et-Vilaine 
 a lieu-dit in Ledringhem in the Nord département
 Sainte-Anne Hospital Center in Paris

Belgium 
 Château de Lavaux-Sainte-Anne, in the Namur province

Culture 
Sainte Anne, one of the planets in The Fifth Head of Cerberus
Ste. Anne (film), a 2021 Canadian film

See also
Saint Anne (disambiguation)
List of rivers named Sainte-Anne
St Ann (disambiguation)
St Anne's (disambiguation)
St Ann's (disambiguation)
Santa Ana (disambiguation)
Anna (disambiguation)
Fort Sainte Anne (disambiguation)